Cristian Antonio García González (born 2 March 1981) is a Peruvian footballer who plays as a left back for Deportivo Municipal in the Torneo Descentralizado.

Club career
Cristian García began his career in 1999 with Cienciano. There he had his first experience in the Torneo Descentralizado and played with the Cusco outfit until the mid part of the 2001 season.

He then joined Alianza Lima in July 2001.

International career
On 27 September 2012 García was called up to play for the Peru national team.

References

1981 births
Living people
Footballers from Lima
Peruvian footballers
Cienciano footballers
Club Alianza Lima footballers
FBC Melgar footballers
Alianza Atlético footballers
José Gálvez FBC footballers
Sport Áncash footballers
Total Chalaco footballers
Real Garcilaso footballers
Deportivo Municipal footballers
Peruvian Primera División players
Association football fullbacks